Juan Tejera (born 26 July 1983 in Montevideo) is a retiredUruguayan footballer.

Career
Tejera began his career in Uruguay playing for Liverpool de Montevideo in the Primera División Uruguaya.

In 2010, Tejera joined Olimpo, recently promoted to the Argentine Primera División.

References

External links

1983 births
Living people
Uruguayan footballers
Uruguayan expatriate footballers
Footballers from Montevideo
Association football midfielders
Association football defenders
Uruguayan Primera División players
Argentine Primera División players
Categoría Primera A players
Liverpool F.C. (Montevideo) players
C.A. Rentistas players
Central Español players
Boyacá Chicó F.C. footballers
Olimpo footballers
Defensa y Justicia footballers
Juventud Unida Universitario players
Club Agropecuario Argentino players
Racing de Córdoba footballers
Estudiantes de Río Cuarto footballers
Uruguayan expatriate sportspeople in Colombia
Uruguayan expatriate sportspeople in Argentina
Expatriate footballers in Colombia
Expatriate footballers in Argentina